Loch Essan is a freshwater trout loch, located 2 miles  north of Loch Dochart, within the Stirling Council Area, Scotland.

Settlements
On the mid north coast of the loch is the remains of four Shieling hut with no roofs. The huts would have been used as lodges for shepherds, summer livestock grazers, and much later, after the Highland Clearances, fly fisherman, before they fell into disrepair due to lack of maintenance. The loch now a bothy, a former 3 roomed shepherd's cottage.

References

Essan
Essan
Tay catchment